Axtell is a city in Marshall County, Kansas, United States.  As of the 2020 census, the population of the city was 399.

History
The first settlements were made at Axtell in the 1860s. The first post office in Axtell was established in December 1871.  Axtell was laid out in 1872 when the railroad was extended to that point, and a railroad depot was built that year. It was named for Jesse Axtell, a railroad official.

Geography
Axtell is located at  (39.872447, -96.257361).

Climate
This climatic region is typified by large seasonal temperature differences, with warm to hot (and often humid) summers and cold (sometimes severely cold) winters.  According to the Köppen Climate Classification system, Axtell has a humid continental climate, abbreviated "Dfa" on climate maps.

Demographics

2010 census
As of the census of 2010, there were 406 people, 178 households, and 111 families residing in the city. The racial makeup of the city was 96.8% White and 3.2% from two or more races.

There were 178 households, of which 24.7% had children under the age of 18 living with them, 52.8% were married couples living together, 5.6% had a female householder with no husband present, 3.9% had a male householder with no wife present, and 37.6% were non-families. 33.1% of all households were made up of individuals, and 16.3% had someone living alone who was 65 years of age or older. The average household size was 2.28 and the average family size was 2.95.

The median age in the city was 43 years. 25.1% of residents were under the age of 18; 6.9% were between the ages of 18 and 24; 19.7% were from 25 to 44; 25.1% were from 45 to 64; and 23.2% were 65 years of age or older. The gender makeup of the city was 51.7% male and 48.3% female.

2000 census
As of the census of 2000, there were 445 people, 182 households, and 129 families residing in the city. The racial makeup of the city was 96.85% White, 0.90% Native American, 0.22% Asian, 1.12% from other races, and 0.90% from two or more races. Hispanic or Latino people of any race were 1.57% of the population.

There were 182 households, out of which 30.2% had children under the age of 18 living with them, 59.9% were married couples living together, 8.8% had a female householder with no husband present, and 28.6% were non-families. 27.5% of all households were made up of individuals, and 10.4% had someone living alone who was 65 years of age or older. The average household size was 2.45 and the average family size was 2.99.

In the city, the population was spread out, with 26.7% under the age of 18, 6.7% from 18 to 24, 23.1% from 25 to 44, 23.1% from 45 to 64, and 20.2% who were 65 years of age or older. The median age was 40 years. For every 100 females, there were 91.0 males. For every 100 females age 18 and over, there were 89.5 males.

The median income for a household in the city was $30,192, and the median income for a family was $35,000. Males had a median income of $29,250 versus $23,500 for females. The per capita income for the city was $14,460. About 12.3% of families and 11.1% of the population were below the poverty line, including 15.7% of those under age 18 and 8.7% of those age 65 or over.

Education
The community is served by Prairie Hills USD 113 public school district, formed in 2010 by the merger of Sabetha USD 441 and Axtel USD 488.

References

Further reading

External links
 Axtell - Directory of Public Officials
 Axtell city map, KDOT
 The Axtell Standard newspaper, published 1898–1972, archived on Newspapers.com; also see Library of Congress article "About The Axtell Standard. (Axtell, Kan.) 1898-1972"

Cities in Kansas
Cities in Marshall County, Kansas